Makeoana is a community council located in the Berea District of Lesotho. Its population in 2006 was 33,445.

Villages
The community of Makeoana includes the villages of: 
 
 Bophephetsa
 Ha 'Makaliso
 Ha 'Malekhase
 Ha 'Mamatebele
 Ha 'Mapa
 Ha 'Molaoa
 Ha Bela-Besa
 Ha Boranta
 Ha Chabeli
 Ha Chakatsa
 Ha Chetane (Ha Tau)
 Ha Jobo
 Ha Khamothi
 Ha Khoarai
 Ha Khopo
 Ha Kutsupa
 Ha Lebese
 Ha Lebona
 Ha Lejaha
 Ha Lesibe
 Ha Letsie
 Ha Lieta
 Ha Mahana
 Ha Maime
 Ha Makhaola
 Ha Makoanyane
 Ha Makomo
 Ha Makopotsa
 Ha Malepa
 Ha Malibeng
 Ha Mangana
 Ha Mangoato
 Ha Maqotoane
 Ha Masopha (Meeling)
 Ha Matekane (Ha Kota)
 Ha Matsa
 Ha Matsoso
 Ha Mokoena
 Ha Molikuoa
 Ha Monyai
 Ha Mothakathi
 Ha Mothethi
 Ha Nkunyane
 Ha Nkutu (Sebetia)
 Ha Nkutunyane (Tloaalang)
 Ha Nonyana
 Ha Ntsane
 Ha Oetsi
 Ha Phatsoa
 Ha Pita
 Ha Posholi
 Ha Pulumo
 Ha Puoane
 Ha Raletsae
 Ha Ramohobo
 Ha Seana
 Ha Seme
 Ha Seraha-Majoe
 Ha Taaso
 Ha Thabo
 Ha Thebe (Sebetia)
 Ha Tobolela
 Khetha
 Khoakhoeng
 Khokhoba
 Lehlakaneng
 Lihlolong
 Liphakoeng
 Machalefose
 Mafikeng
 Mafotholeng
 Maholong
 Makh'anfolei
 Makhalong
 Makhanfolehi
 Maluba-Lube
 Mankoeng
 Maphatšoaneng
 Matangoaneng
 Matemeng
 Meeling
 Mokoallong
 Motse-Mocha (Qethane)
 Motsekuoa
 Nkhetheleng
 Phahameng
 Pokellong
 Qethane
 Sehlabeng
 Sekokoaneng
 Terai Hoek
 Thabana-Tšooana
 Tsipa and Vukazenzele

References

External links
 Google map of community villages

Populated places in Berea District